Albert Smiley Williams (1849–1924) was an American Democratic politician. He served as the Mayor of Nashville, Tennessee, from 1904 to 1906.

Early life
Williams was born in Davidson County, Tennessee on November 15, 1849.

Career
Williams served as Mayor of Edgefield (now part of East Nashville) from 1876 to 1877, and of Nashville from 1904 to 1906. He was a member of the Order of the Eastern Star.

Personal life and death
Williams was married to Amanda Rear on December 3, 1879. They had four children: Albert, Beryl (Mrs. Stanley Horn), and two children who died in childhood. He died in 1924.

References

1849 births
1924 deaths
Order of the Eastern Star
Tennessee Democrats
Mayors of Nashville, Tennessee
People from Davidson County, Tennessee